Frank Morrad (28 February 1920 – 13 July 1981) was an English professional footballer who played in the Football League as a forward, most notably for Leyton Orient and Brighton & Hove Albion.

Playing career 
Morrad began his career as a junior with Brentford in 1936. He later moved to Athenian League club Southall and began his professional career with Third Division South club Notts County prior to the outbreak of the Second World War. During the war, Morrad guested for Arsenal, Clapton Orient and Crystal Palace, before finally making his professional debut for Notts County in 1946. He moved to fellow Third Division South club Leyton Orient, for whom he had guested during the war, in November 1946. Morrad found his form at Brisbane Road and scored 11 goals in 25 games during the second half of the 1946–47 season. Morrad departed the Os in August 1947 for Second Division club Fulham, but he failed to make an appearance for the club.

Morrad dropped to the Third Division South to join Brighton & Hove Albion in February 1948 and remained with the club until August 1951, when he rejoined hometown club Brentford. He made just six appearances for the Bees and joined Southern League club Bedford Town in 1953, for whom he made 59 appearances before retiring in 1954.

Personal life 
After his retirement from football, Morrad ran a chain of betting shops in West London. In the 1960s, he employed former Brentford player Ken Coote as manager of one of the branches.

Career statistics

References

1920 births
1981 deaths
Footballers from Brentford
English footballers
Brentford F.C. players
English Football League players
Southall F.C. players
Notts County F.C. players
Leyton Orient F.C. players
Fulham F.C. players
Southern Football League players
Association football forwards
Brighton & Hove Albion F.C. players
Bedford Town F.C. players
Arsenal F.C. wartime guest players
Clapton Orient F.C. wartime guest players
Crystal Palace F.C. wartime guest players
British expatriates in Spain